Parallel voting is a type of mixed electoral system in which representatives are voted into a single chamber using two or more different systems, most often first-past-the-post voting (FPTP) with party-list proportional representation (PR). It is the most common form of mixed member majoritarian representation (MMM), which is why these terms are often used synonymously with each other. In some countries, parallel voting is known as the supplementary member (SM) system, while in academic literature it is sometimes called the superposition method within mixed systems. 

Parallel voting, as a form of mixed member majoritarian (semi-proportional) representation is used in the election of national parliaments as well as local governments in various places such as Italy, Japan, Taiwan, Lithuania, Russia, and Argentina. It is distinct from the mixed election system known as mixed-member proportional representation (MMP) or the additional member system (AMS). Under MMP/AMS, district seats are filled and the party vote determines what proportional share of seats each party will receive in the legislature, through "topping up" the party's district seats. Under parallel voting, the election of the two groups of members are not connected in any way, except that they will serve in the same chamber.

While FPTP with PR is the most common pairing in parallel voting, many other combinations are possible. The proportion of list seats compared to total seats ranges widely; for example 30% in Taiwan, 37.5% in Japan and 68.7% in Armenia.

Definitions 
Although the terms are often applied to the same systems, the terms mixed-member majoritarian representation and parallel voting mean different things.

Parallel voting may also use two proportional components, or it may use one semi-proportional and one proportional component (e.g. SNTV and PR used in Japan). For this reason parallel voting is not always mixed-member majoritarian. Some mixed-member majoritarian systems use some interaction (compensation) between two tiers (e.g. Hungary or South Korea), which parallel voting does not do.

Other mixed-member majoritarian systems, such as that used in Italy (Rosatellum), use a single vote, which makes them different from parallel voting even if they use some of the same sub-methods (superposition) as parallel voting.

Parallel voting is not to be confused with electoral systems where de facto two or more systems are used in "parallel" because by default, party-list proportional representation would be used, but the districts are created in a way that some have only a single seat. In this case, unlike in parallel voting, each voter have only one vote and their vote would count only in their district (unless levelling seats were also used).

Procedure
Under the most common form of parallel voting, a portion of seats in the legislature are filled by the first-past-the-post method (FPTP/SMP), meaning each district elects one member, and the candidate with the most votes in the single round election wins the seat. Alternatives include using the two-round system (TRS), in which case the top two candidates participate in a runoff election if no candidate received more than 50% of votes in the first round, or multi-member district systems such as SNTV or block voting. Other seats are filled via a list PR system based on party list votes, with parties often needing to have polled a certain threshold, typically a small percentage, in order to achieve any representation (as is also common in many proportional systems). Any supplementary seats won by a party are usually filled from an ordered list of nominated candidates, but open list 

In parallel voting, voters cast two (or more) ballots for each type of method the system contains but these votes have no effect on the calculation of seats in the other methods. If the combination of FPTP and list PR is used, voters cast these votes at the same time. If a two-round system is used, voters cast their party list vote in the first round, and a second round is only held in districts where no candidate achieved a majority in the first round among votes for local candidates. Occasionally a system does not allow some voters to cast both constituency and party-list votes, for example non-residents might not have a geographic constituency and therefore may only vote for party lists.

Unlike mixed-member proportional representation, where party lists are used to achieve an overall proportional result in the legislature, under parallel voting, proportionality is confined only to the list seats. Therefore, a party that secured, say, 5% of the vote will have only 5% of the list seats, and not 5% of all the seats in the legislature.

Advantages and disadvantages

Representation for smaller parties 
The major critique of parallel systems is that they cannot guarantee overall proportionality. Large parties can win very large majorities, disproportionate to their percentage vote.

Parallel voting systems allow smaller parties that cannot win individual elections to secure at least some representation in the legislature; however, unlike in a proportional system they will have a substantially smaller delegation than their share of the total vote. This is seen by advocates of proportional systems to be better than elections using only first-past-the-post, but still unfair towards to constituents of smaller parties. If there is also a threshold for list seats, parties which are too small to reach the threshold are unable to achieve any representation, unless they have a very strong base in certain constituencies to gain individual seats. 

Smaller parties are still disadvantaged as the larger parties still predominate. Voters of smaller parties may tactically vote for candidates of larger parties to avoid wasting their constituency vote. If the smaller party close to the threshold may refrain from voting for their preferred party in favour of a larger party to avoid wasting their list vote as well. In countries where there is one dominant party and a divided opposition, the proportional seats may be essential for allowing an effective opposition.

Those who favour majoritarian systems argue that supplementary seats allocated proportionally increases the chances that no party received a majority in an assembly, leading to minority or coalition governments.; the largest parties may need to rely on the support of smaller ones in order to form a government. Those who favour proportional representation see this as an advantage as parties may not govern alone, but have to compromise. It is also argued that parallel voting does not lead to the degree of fragmentation found in party systems under pure forms of proportional representation.

Two types of representatives 
Because voters have two votes, one for a constituency candidate and one for a list, there is a critique that two classes of representatives will emerge under a parallel voting system: with one class beholden to their electorate seat, and the other concerned only with their party. Some consider this as an advantage as local as well as national interests will be represented. Some prefer systems where every constituency and therefore every constituent has only one representative, while others prefer a system where every MP represents the electorate as a whole as this is reflected in the electoral system as well.

Compared to MMP and AMS 
Parallel systems are often contrasted with mixed-member proportional systems (MMP) or the additional member system (AMS). There are a unique set of advantages and disadvantages that apply to these specific comparisons.

A party that can gerrymander local districts can win more than its share of seats. So parallel systems need fair criteria to draw district boundaries. (Under MMP a gerrymander can help a local candidate, but it cannot raise a major party’s share of seats, while under AMS the effects of gerrymandering are reduced by the compensation)

Japan, and subsequently Thailand and Russia adopted a parallel system to provide incentives for greater party cohesiveness. The party is sure to elect the candidates at the top of its list, guaranteeing safe seats for the leadership. By contrast, under the MMP or AMS system a party that does well in the local seats will not need or receive any compensatory list seats, so the leadership might have to run in the local seats.

Certain types of AMS can be made de facto parallel systems by tactical voting and parties using decoy lists, which (other) MMP systems generally avoid. This specific type of tactical voting does not occur in parallel voting systems as there is no interaction between its systems to exploit in a way that makes it irrelevant. However, other types of tactical voting (such as compromising) are more relevant under parallel voting, than under AMS, and are virtually irrelevant under MMP. Tactical voting by supporters of larger parties in favour of allied smaller parties close to a threshold, to help their entry to parliament are a possibility in any parallel, AMS or MMP system with an electoral threshold.

Parallel systems support the creation of single-party majorities more often than MMP or AMS systems, this may be a positive or a negative depending on the view of the voter.

Use

Current use
Parallel voting is currently used in the following countries:

Philippines 
The Philippines' electoral system for Congress is an exceptional case. Political parties running for party-list seats are legally required to be completely separate from those running in constituency seats. Furthermore, political parties are capped at 3 seats (out of 61). As a result, the mixed-member system utilized in the Philippines is not representative at all of the share of the vote that "normal" political parties obtain (even amongst mixed-member majoritarian systems), let alone for those in full proportional representation systems.

Hybrid use and similar systems 

 Hungary's National Assembly uses a system where the parallel voting component shares a pool of seats (93) with the vote transfer system and with the minority list seats with a reduced entry threshold. This means the number of seats effectively assigned proportionally based on the parallel party list votes is unknown/unknowable before the election takes place.
 Italy: Starting with the 2018 election, both houses of the Italian parliament are elected using a system similar to parallel voting. 62.5% of the seats are assigned proportionally to party lists; party lists are also linked in coalitions supporting constituency candidates running for the remaining 37.5% of the available seats, who are elected by means of a first-past-the-post system. Electors have a single vote with two-fold effects for a party list (proportional) and its associated local candidate (majoritarian). Split-ticket voting is not allowed, a voter may mark their ballots only next to a list, a candidate, or a list and a candidate associated with it and all of these votes has the same effect. If a voter marks a candidate not associated with the list they marked, like voters may under parallel voting, the vote is invalid under the Italian system.
 Jersey (UK)
 Monaco
 Mexico: In contrast to the parallel voting system for the Chamber of Deputies, for electing the Chamber of Senators (upper house), a single (party list) vote is used similarly to the Italian system. However, constituencies have 3 seats with a type of limited (party block) voting being used: 2 seats are given to the largest party and 1 to the second largest party. Party-list PR is used for the nationwide seats.
 Pakistan
 Seychelles
 South Korea's National Assembly used parallel voting from 1988 to 2019. Since 2019, it uses a hybrid system of parallel voting and mixed-member proportional, with both compensatory seats (30) and supplementary seats (17).

Former use
 Albania used parallel voting in the 1996 and 1997 elections (before switching to mixed-member proportional representation from 2001 to 2005).
 Argentina: Santiago del Estero Province (1997–2009)
 Armenia
 Azerbaijan's National Assembly (the Milli Məclis) had previously used an SM system in which 100 members were elected for five-year terms in single-seat constituencies and 25 were members were elected by proportional representation. Since the latest election Azerbaijan has returned to electing members from single-member constituencies. Due to the corruption present within Azerbaijan, the limited proportionality that SM was able to offer had little effect.
Bulgaria (1990, 2009)
 Croatia (1993–2001)
 Egypt (2020)
 Italy (1993–2005, with modifications)
 North Macedonia (1998)
 Palestinian Authority (2005), for the next election, the system was changed to party-list proportional representation.
Ukraine: In the last elections to the Verkhovna Rada, a parallel voting system was used. 50% of seats are distributed under party lists with a 5% election threshold and 50% through first-past-the-post in single-member constituencies. The method of 50/50 mixed elections was used in the 2002, 2012, 2014 and 2019 elections; however, in 2006 and 2007, the elections were held under a proportional system only. According to the election law that became valid on 1 January 2020 the next election to the Verkhovna Rada (set for 2023) again will be held under a proportional scheme.

Proposals for use
New Zealand considered adopting Parallel Voting but instead MMP was more popular.
In New Zealand, the Royal Commission on the Electoral System reviewed the electoral system in 1985-86 and considered SM to be a possible replacement for plurality voting, which was in use at the time. They suggested SM could be implemented in New Zealand with the following features: each elector would have 2 votes, 1 for a constituency candidate and the other for a party list; there would be a total of 120 seats, with 90 seats determined by votes in constituencies and the remaining 30 from party lists; a modified Sainte-Laguë method would be used to allocate list seats proportionate to a party's total share of votes, a threshold of 5% was suggested before parties could be allocated seats.

The commission came to the conclusion that SM would be unable to overcome the shortcomings of New Zealand's previous plurality electoral system (FPP). The total seats won by a party would likely remain out of proportion to its share of votes—there would be a "considerable imbalance between share of the votes and share of the total seats"—and would be unfair to minor parties (who struggle to win constituency seats). In the indicative 1992 electoral referendum, SM was one of the four choices of alternative electoral system (alongside MMP, AV and STV), but came last with only 5.5 percent of the vote. By clear majority, a change to MMP was favoured, as recommended by the Royal Commission, and was subsequently adopted after the 1993 electoral referendum.

In another referendum in 2011, 57.77% of voters elected to keep current the MMP system. Among the 42.23% that voted to change to another system, a plurality (46.66%) preferred a return to the pre-1994 plurality electoral system (also known as First-past-the-post, FPTP). Supplementary member was the second-most popular choice, with 24.14% of the vote.

References

External links
A Handbook of Electoral System Design from International IDEA
 Electoral Design Reference Materials from the ACE Project
 Accurate Democracy suggests Parallel Voting by PR and Condorcet rules to make a balanced council with a few central swing voters.

Electoral systems
Semi-proportional electoral systems
Mixed electoral systems